The men's 50 metre freestyle S13 event at the 2022 Commonwealth Games was held on 30 July at the Sandwell Aquatics Centre.

This marked the first time visually impaired swimming was held at the Commonwealth Games.

Nicolas-Guy Turbide of Canada won the event with a time of 24.32.

Results

Final

References

Men's 50 metre freestyle S13